Salaverry District is one of eleven districts of the province Trujillo in Peru.

See also
Trujillo Province
Buenos Aires
Trujillo

References